Poropuntius krempfi is a species of ray-finned fish in the genus Poropuntius from the Red River drainage in Vietnam and Yunnan, and from the Ma River drainage in Vietnam and Laos.

References 

krempfi
Fish described in 1934